Vixen is the debut studio album by American rock band Vixen, released on August 31, 1988, by EMI's Manhattan Records. It includes the singles "Edge of a Broken Heart" and "Cryin'", which reached numbers 26 and 22 on the Billboard Hot 100, respectively.

Richard Marx, one of the late 1980s' most successful recording artists, was heavily involved in Vixen's early career, co-producing the album and writing one of their highest-charting singles, "Edge of a Broken Heart".

The three songs co-written by Jeff Paris, "Cryin'", "One Night Alone" and the bonus track "Charmed Life" were previously released on Paris's 1987 solo album Wired Up. "Give It Away" is credited to Paris's real name Geoffrey Leib and was included on his previous album Race to Paradise from 1986.

Vixen was featured at number 43 in Rolling Stone magazine's list of the "50 Greatest Hair Metal Albums of All Time".  The album was certified gold by the Recording Industry Association of America (RIAA) on February 6, 1989.

Track listing

Personnel
Credits adapted from the liner notes of Vixen.

Vixen
 Janet Gardner – lead vocals, rhythm guitar, background vocals
 Jan Kuehnemund – lead and rhythm guitar, background vocals
 Roxy Petrucci – drums, background vocals
 Share Pedersen – bass, background vocals

Additional personnel
 Richard Marx – keyboards, production, arrangements 
 Brian Foraker – engineering, mixing 
 David Cole – production, arrangements, engineering, mixing 
 Rick Neigher – production, arrangements 
 Spencer Proffer – production, arrangements 
 Hans Peter Huber – engineering 
 Peter Doell – additional engineering
 Annette Cisneros, Judy Clapp, Mark Stebbeds, Jimmy Perziosi – engineering assistance
 Greg Fulginiti – mastering at Artisan Sound Recorders (Hollywood, California)
 Susanne Marie Edgren, Lewis Kovac – production coordination
 Henry Marquez – creative direction
 Robert Fusfield – art direction
 Nels – photography
 Glen La Ferman – back cover photography

Charts

Weekly charts

Year-end charts

Certifications

Notes

References

1988 debut albums
Albums produced by Richard Marx
Albums produced by Spencer Proffer
Albums produced by David N. Cole
Albums recorded at Capitol Studios
Manhattan Records albums
Vixen (band) albums